Aleksandr Nikolaevich Baluev (born 6 December 1958) is a Soviet and Russian theatre and film actor who appeared in more than 100 films and numerous stage productions since 1980.

Life and career
Aleksandr Baluev was born in Moscow, Russian SFSR, Soviet Union. He graduated in 1975 from Moscow School № 637. After unsuccessful attempts to enter the Boris Shchukin Theatre Institute he worked for a year as assistant illuminator in the light department at Mosfilm. The second attempt was more successful, with Aleksandr entering the Moscow Art Theatre School on Pavel Massalsky's course. In 1980, he successfully completed the training and became an actor of the Soviet Army Theatre. The first role in his theatrical career was playing in productions of Clock Without Hands and Lady of the Camellias.

In 1986, Aleksandr Baluev went to the Moscow Yermolova Theatre, playing leading roles in productions of The Second Year of Freedom, Snow Near the Prison, and Caligula.

In the late 1980s, Aleksandr Baluev left the theater. He is now active in the enterprise and collaborates with the Lenkom Theatre.

Family 
In 2003, he married a Polish citizen, journalist Maria Urbanowska, after dating for 10 years. Their daughter Maria Anna was born the same year. In 2013, they divorced.

Selected filmography

Awards and nominations

References

External links

	
 	
  Aleksandr Baluev in ruskino.ru
 Aleksandr Baluev, Lenkom Theatre
 Aleksandr Baluev, talk show Приглашает Борис Ноткин (TV Centre), 4 November 2014
 Aleksandr Baluev, Александр Балуев. В меня заложен этот шифр (TV Centre), 6 December 2018
 Aleksandr Baluev, documentary Александр Балуев. У меня нет слабостей (1HDTV), 2 June 2019

	

1958 births	
Living people
Soviet male film actors
Russian male film actors
Russian male television actors
Soviet male stage actors
Russian male stage actors
Male actors from Moscow
20th-century Russian male actors
21st-century Russian male actors
Recipients of the Nika Award
Moscow Art Theatre School alumni